Mohammed Oreibi Al-Khalifa (27 October 1969 – 2 April 2021) was chief judge of the Iraqi Special Tribunal's Al-Anfal trial.

Career
Oreibi graduated from the Faculty Law of Baghdad University in 1992 and was appointed a judge in 2000 by a presidential decree. 

He was named as judge in the Saddam trial in August 2004.

Saddam trial
During the sectarian war in 2006, his brother in law was shot dead.

Death
He died on 2 April 2021, at a hospital in Baghdad after contracting COVID-19.

References

21st-century Iraqi judges
1969 births
2021 deaths
University of Baghdad alumni
Deaths from the COVID-19 pandemic in Iraq